Scattering Branch is a stream in Audrain and Monroe Counties in the U.S. state of Missouri. It is a tributary of Long Branch.

The stream was named for the forks along its watercourse.

See also
List of rivers of Missouri

References

Rivers of Audrain County, Missouri
Rivers of Monroe County, Missouri
Rivers of Missouri